Zhengzhou Bus Rapid Transit is a bus rapid transit system in Zhengzhou, the capital of Henan Province in the People's Republic of China. The system has 5 main trunk routes with dedicated bus lanes along with a number of feeder routes that run for a portion of the corridor and serves other areas.

History
Construction of the first segment started in 2008 and free trial operations started on May 22, 2009. The system officially started operation on May 28, 2009 with a 30 km loop line (B1) with 38 stations. Average ridership of the system in 2014 was 700,000 passengers. It is believed that the daily ridership was approximately 1 million passengers after the opening of the first segment of the 23.7 km long 3rd Ring Road loop line (B3) on June 26, 2014. The route B3 interlined with 15 feeder routes. A new east-west BRT corridor under the Longhai Elevated Road opened on January 26, 2017. This corridor is served by route B5. The Zhengzhou government is proposing to introduce trolleybus lines to the B2 Nongye Road BRT corridor, reintroducing trolleybus operation to Zhengzhou which stopped operation in 2010. In 2019, overhead trolleybus lines were installed along the B2 Corridor.

Routes 
Main trunk routes with dedicated bus lanes:
 B1: Zhongzhou Avenue & Nongye Road — Dianchang Road bus terminal (Route altered after Zhengzhou Metro Line 5 began operation in May 2019)
 B2: Daxie bus terminal — Zhongzhou Avenue & Nongye Road
 B3: Loop Line, runs on North, West and South 3rd Ring Road and Zhongzhou Avenue (South 3rd Ring Road & Daxue Road is the terminal station)
 B5: West 3rd Ring Road & Longhai Road — Zhengzhou East Railway Station, runs mostly under the Longhai Elevated Road
 B6: Loop Line: runs on North 3rd Ring Road, Zhongzhou Avenue, Weilai Road, Changjiang Road, Qinling Road and Dianchang Road (Dianchang Road bus terminal is the terminal station)

There are also dozens of feeder routes connecting the main routes with other areas of the city.

Gallery

References 

 
Bus rapid transit in China
Transport in Zhengzhou
Transport in Henan